The National Rugby League Heritage Round was established in 2008 to celebrate the 101st Anniversary of the inaugural New South Wales Rugby League 1908 premiership. This marked 101 years of Rugby league in Australia. Each Club would play a rivalry match against a Club that joined the competition at a similar time, or a club which had inherited a legacy of a past club.

Heritage Jerseys
Clubs wear a different Jersey to their normal home and away strips to mark the significance of the Heritage Round clashes. It is an opportunity for clubs and fans to reflect on their heritage and past glories. As such Jerseys similar to a club's original strip, or strip worn at a particular match or final are a way to reignite rivalries and past glories.

Some examples of jerseys worn in Heritage Round reflect the jersey worn by a side when it first entered the NRL include that worn by the Brisbane Broncos, South Sydney Rabbitohs, St George Illawarra Dragons or Sydney Roosters. The design or colours of a jersey might also denote respect for a side from the same area which no longer exists, such as the design of the Gold Coast Titans and Newcastle Knights heritage jerseys in 2008.

Clubs have also worn Jerseys that reflect an important milestone or event. An example of this is the Balmain Heritage Jersey worn by the Wests Tigers in the 2009 Heritage Round, marking 40 years since a famous Grand Final clash with the South Sydney Rabbitohs. Another example is the Melbourne Storm wearing their 2000 away strip in 2009 as it marked the first Jersey in predominantly purple colours.

Heritage Round 2008 - Centenary of Rugby League
The first NRL Heritage Round was played out in Round 6, 2008. It was set down to celebrate the anniversary of the first round of the 1908 premiership. Teams wore jerseys reflecting their club or region's first season in the competition.

Heritage Round 2009 - Second Heritage Round
The second NRL Heritage Round was played out in Round 10. The round opened with a thrilling match between the Dragons and Bulldogs, in which Hazem El Masri played his 300th career game, that was controversially settled by the Video Referee disallowing a try to Jamal Idris in the last minute to deny the Bulldogs victory in front of a packed Jubilee Oval. On the same night, a large crowd turned out in Brisbane to watch the local derby between the Brisbane Broncos and Gold Coast Titans.

Another memorable match was played out at the Sydney Cricket Ground on Sunday afternoon, as South Sydney and the Wests Tigers relived the 1969 Grand Final, with Souths narrowly defeating the Tigers in the dying moments of the game with a field goal.

See also

AFL Heritage Round

References

External links

National Rugby League
Rugby league club matches
Rugby league rivalries
Sports rivalries in Australia